William James Davern (3 September 1883 – 4 June 1952) was an Australian rules footballer who played with Geelong in the Victorian Football League (VFL).

Notes

External links 

1883 births
1952 deaths
Australian rules footballers from Western Australia
Geelong Football Club players
Warrnambool Football Club players
West Perth Football Club players